Sieur Dubois or Sieur D. B. was a French traveller who reached the islands of Madagascar and Réunion at the time of early colonization by France. He wrote a book in French, published in 1674, about his journeys and the wildlife he saw including details of several species of birds endemic to Réunion that have since become extinct, such as the Réunion ibis, Réunion swamphen, and Réunion rail. Captain Samuel Pasfield Oliver translated and edited the original French version into an English version, which was published in 1897.

References

Cited texts

French explorers
French travel writers
French naturalists
17th-century pseudonymous writers
French male non-fiction writers